Edith Rogers may refer to:

 Edith Rogers (Alberta politician), Canadian member of the Legislative Assembly of Alberta, 1935–1940
 Edith Rogers (Manitoba politician), Canadian member of the Legislative Assembly of Manitoba, 1920–1932
 Edith Nourse Rogers (1881–1960), American politician
 Edie Rogers (born 1934), member of the South Carolina Senate